Nationality words link to articles with information on the nation's poetry or literature (for instance, Irish or France).

Events

Works published

England
Richard Barnfield, The Affectionate Shepheard
 Richard Carew, Godfrey of Bulloigne; or, The Recouverie of Hierusalem, translated from the Italian of the first five books of Torquato Tasso's Gerusalemme Liberatta
George Chapman, Skia Nyktos. The Shadow of Night, the first two words of the title are in Ancient Greek
 Henry Constable, Diana; or, The Excellent Conceitful Sonnets of H.C., the second edition of Diana (first edition 1592)
 Samuel Daniel, Delia and Rosamond Augmented; [with] Cleopatra, the third edition of Delia and of Rosamond; first edition of Cleopatra (see also Delia 1592)
 Michael Drayton:
 Ideas Mirrour, 51 sonnets
 Matilda (reprinted in an expanded version, with corrections, in The Tragicall Legend of Robert Duke of Normandy 1596)
 Peirs Gaveston Earle of Cornwall
 Robert Greene:
 Orlando Furioso, published anonymously
 See also Thomas Lodge and Robert Greene, below
 Thomas Heywood, Oenone and Paris
 Sir David Lyndsay, Squire Meldrum, also contains The testament of the nobill and vailzeand Squyer Williame Meldrum of the Bynnis
 Thomas Lodge and Robert Greene, A Looking Glasse, for London and Englande
 Thomas Lodge, The Wounds of Civill War, Lively Set Forth in the True Tragedies of Marius and Scilla, in verse and prose
 Thomas Morley, Madrigalls to Foure Voyces, verse and music
 John Mundy, editor, Songs and Psalms
William Shakespeare, The Rape of Lucrece, as Lucrece, dedicated to Henry Wriothesley, third earl of Southampton; likely printed from the author's own manuscript; reprinted seven times by 1640
Thomas Storer, Life and Death of Cardinal Wolsey
Henry Willobie, alternate spellings "Henry Willoby" and "Henry Willoughby", an unidentified author, Willobie His Avisa, the book has a possible association with Shakespeare's sonnets

Other
 Torquato Tasso, Le sette giornate, Italy
 Jacob Spanmuller, also known as "Jacobus Pontanus", Poeticae institutiones, criticism

Births
Death years link to the corresponding "[year] in poetry" article:
 March 25 – Maria Tesselschade Visscher (died 1649), Dutch
 September 30 – Antoine Gérard de Saint-Amant (died 1661), French
 Also:
 John Chalkhill, birth year uncertain (died 1642), English
 James Howell, birth year uncertain (died 1666), English pamphleteer and poet
 Jacques de Serisay (died 1653), French poet and the founding director of the Académie française

Deaths
Birth years link to the corresponding "[year] in poetry" article:
 c. February 7 – Barnabe Googe (born 1540), English pastoral poet and translator
 May 30 – Bálint Balassi (born 1554), Hungarian lyric poet
 August 15 (bur.) – Thomas Kyd (born 1558), English dramatist and poet
 November 29 – Alonso de Ercilla (born 1533), Spanish

See also

 Poetry
 16th century in poetry
 16th century in literature
 Dutch Renaissance and Golden Age literature
 Elizabethan literature
 English Madrigal School
 French Renaissance literature
 Renaissance literature
 Spanish Renaissance literature
 University Wits

Notes

16th-century poetry
Poetry